Gérard Lopez (born 1949) is a French psychiatrist. He was a pioneer in development of abuse and rape victim treatment, rape trauma syndrome, psychological trauma and the effects and aftermath of rape. He is president and founder of the Institut de Victimologie de Paris.

References

French psychiatrists
1949 births
Living people